TS/A is a mouse mammary adenocarcinoma cell line established in the early 1980s from a spontaneous tumor of a retired breeder BALB/c female mouse.
In the 1990s it was widely used as a recipient cell line for the transduction of cytokine genes and other genes of immunological interest, to produce recombinant experimental vaccines that induced anti-tumor immunological responses.

References

External links                                                              
Cellosaurus entry for TS/A

Rodent cell lines